São Luiz Gonzaga (Portuguese for St. Aloysius Gonzaga) is a municipality of the state of Rio Grande do Sul, Brazil. Its population is 33,293 (2020 est.) in an area of 1295,68 km². It was founded in the 17th century as a Jesuit mission town. It is located 503 km west of the state capital of Porto Alegre, northeast of Alegrete.

Bounding municipalities

Roque Gonzales
Rolador
Caibaté
São Miguel das Missões
Bossoroca
Santo Antônio das Missões
São Nicolau
Dezesseis de Novembro

References

External links
http://www.citybrazil.com.br/rs/saoluizgonzaga/ 

Municipalities in Rio Grande do Sul